The 2013–14 season is South China's 93rd season in the Hong Kong First Division League. South China will seek to defend their league title, as well as to fight for victory in Senior Challenge Shield and FA Cup. They will also participate in the AFC Cup for the first time in three seasons.

Key events
 15 May 2013: The club confirmed that they will not extend Brazilian forward Alessandro Celin's contract while Joel, Dhiego Martins and Ticão will stay at the club. Itaparica, Chan Wai Ho, Lee Chi Ho and Lee Wai Lim have finished their contract and are uncertain about their future.
 16 May 2013: Hong Kong defender Chan Cham Hei and Brazilian forward Alessandro Celin are released by the club.
 31 May 2013: Brazilian midfielder João Emir Porto Pereira rejoins the club on a free transfer. He played for the club in the 2011–12 season but left the club after the season.
 31 May 2013: Brazilian midfielder Aender Naves Mesquita joins the club from newly relegated club Wofo Tai Po on a free transfer.
 31 May 2013: Taiwanese-Spanish defender Victor Chou is released by the club.
 1 June 2013: Chinese-born Hong Kong goalkeeper Zhang Chunhui rejoins the club from fellow First Division club Sunray Cave JC Sun Hei for an undisclosed fee.
 1 June 2013: The club confirms that Lee Chi Ho will leave the club while Chan Wai Ho chooses to stay.
 7 June 2013: Hong Kong midfielder Au Yeung Yiu Chung joins First Division club Yokohama FC Hong Kong on a free transfer after his contract expiries and is released by the club.
 8 June 2013: Hong Kong defender Chan Cham Hei joins First Division club Biu Chun Rangers on a free transfer after his contract expiries and is released by the club.
 11 June 2013: Brazilian midfielder Itaparica leaves the club and joins newly promoted First Division club Eastern Salon on a free transfer.
 11 June 2013: Hong Kong midfielder Man Pei Tak leaves the club and joins newly promoted First Division club Eastern Salon on a free transfer after his contract expiries and is released by the club.
 11 June 2013: Hong Kong midfielder Chan Siu Kwan joins the club from fellow First Division club Yokohama FC Hong Kong for an undisclosed fee.
 12 June 2013: Guinean striker Mamadou Barry joins the club from fellow First Division club Sunray Cave JC Sun Hei for free.
 14 June 2013: Hong Kong international defender Lee Chi Ho leaves the club and joins Chinese Super League club Beijing Guoan for free.
 20 June 2013: Head coach Liu Chun Fai confirms that he failed to reach an agreement with the club and thus leaves the club after the 1-year contract ends.
 28 June 2013: Hong Kong goalkeeper Tsang Man Fai joins the club from fellow First Division Yokohama FC Hong Kong for an undisclosed fee.
 28 June 2013: Hong Kong striker Lo Kong Wai joins the club from fellow First Division club Yokohama FC Hong Kong for an undisclosed fee.
 1 July 2013: The club appoints Cheung Po Chun as the head coach successor of Liu Chun Fai.
 1 July 2013: The club announces the departure of Yapp Hung Fai, Adam Tse Chi Keung and Filipe de Souza Conceicao. Yapp Hung Fai is set to join Chinese Super League club Guizhou Renhe but the deal is yet to finalised.
 2 July 2013: Unattached Australian defender Jovo Pavlović joins the club on a free transfer.
 2 July 2013: Australian-Hong Kong defender Liu Stephen Garlock joins the club from fellow First Division club Yokohama FC Hong Kong for an undisclosed fee.
 2 July 2013: Hong Kong defender Chan Wai Ho signs a 2-year extension contract with the club.
 18 July 2013: Hong Kong goalkeeper Yapp Hung Fai fails to join Chinese Super League club Guizhou Renhe as Chinese club cannot sign any non-Chinese player. Yapp's contract with the club ends in July 2014.
 6 August 2013: Hong Kong goalkeeper Tsang Man Fai joins fellow First Division club Royal Southern on loan until the end of the season.
 6 August 2013: Brazil-born Hong Kong striker Filipe de Souza Conceicao joins fellow First Division club Sunray Cave JC Sun Hei on loan until the end of the season.
 8 August 2013: Australian defender Jovo Pavlović is released by the club.
 26 August 2013: Unattached South Korean defender Ko Kyung-Joon joins the club on a free transfer.
 28 August 2013: Hong Kong midfielder Law Chun Yan signs his first professional contract with the club after being promoted to the first team.
 30 September 2013: Hong Kong defender Lee Chi Ho signs a 3-month loan contract with the club.
 5 December 2013: Dutch winger Vincent Weijl joins the club on a free transfer. It is noted that Joel's registration is cancelled so as to leave a place for Weiji.
 27 December 2013: Brazilian midfielder Aender Naves Mesquita joins fellow First Division club Biu Chun Rangers on loan until the end of the season.
 31 December 2013: Hong Kong striker Chan Siu Ki rejoins the club from Chinese League One club Guangdong Sunray Cave on a free transfer.
 31 December 2013: Hong Kong midfielder Leung Chun Pong rejoins the club from Chinese League One club Guangdong Sunray Cave on a free transfer.
 31 December 2013: Bosnian striker Saša Kajkut joins the club from Bosnian Premier League club Čelik Zenica on a free transfer after a successful trial.
 31 December 2013: Australian striker Andrew Barisić joins the club from Australia Victorian Premier League club Melbourne Knights on a free transfer.
 3 January 2014: Hong Kong defender Lee Chi Ho rejoins the club from Chinese Super League club Beijing Guoan for an undisclosed fee.
 6 January 2014: Guinean striker Mamadou Barry leaves the club and joins Malaysia Super League club Terengganu on a free transfer.
 6 January 2014: Brazilian defender Joel Bertoti Padilha joins fellow First Division club Biu Chun Rangers on loan until the end of the season.
 14 January 2014: Chinese-born Hong Kong goalkeeper Zhang Chunhui terminates the contract and leaves the club.
 14 January 2014: Hong Kong goalkeeper Leung Hing Kit joins the club on loan from fellow First Division club Biu Chun Rangers until the end of the season.

Players

Squad information

Last update: 28 January 2014
Source: South China FC
Ordered by squad number.
LPLocal player; FPForeign player; NRNon-registered player

2014 AFC Champions League Squad

Remarks:
FP These players are registered as foreign players.
AP These players are registered as AFC Asian players.

2014 AFC Cup squad

Remarks:
FP These players are registered as foreign players.
AP These players are registered as AFC Asian players.

Transfers

In

Out

Loan in

Loan out

Club

Coaching staff

Squad statistics
Note: Voided matches are not counted in the statistics except discipline records.

Overall statistics
{|class="wikitable" style="text-align: center;"
|-
!width="100"|
!width="60"|First Division
!width="60"|Senior Shield
!width="60"|FA Cup
!width="60"|AFC
!width="60"|Total Stats
|-
|align=left|Games played    ||  14 ||  3  || 2  || 6  || 25
|-
|align=left|Games won       ||  6  ||  3  || 1  || 2  || 12
|-
|align=left|Games drawn     ||  7  ||  0  || 1  || 0  || 8
|-
|align=left|Games lost      ||  1  ||  0  || 0  || 4  || 5
|-
|align=left|Goals for       ||  27 ||  8  || 3  || 8  || 46
|-
|align=left|Goals against   ||  18 ||  4  || 2  || 14 || 38
|- =
|align=left|Players used    ||  27 ||  18 || 15 || 19 || 271
|-
|align=left|Yellow cards    ||  22 ||  7  || 11 || 14 || 54
|-
|align=left|Red cards       ||  1  ||  1  || 0  || 1  || 3
|-

Players Used: South China has used a total of 27 different players in all competitions.

Appearances

Last update: 17 April 2014

Top scorers

Last update: 17 April 2014

Disciplinary record
Includes all competitive matches. Players listed below made at least one appearance for the South China first squad during the season.

Substitution record
Includes all competitive matches.

Last updated: 17 April 2014

Captains

Competitions

Overall

First Division League

Classification

Results summary

Results by round

Matches

Pre-season friendlies

Premier League Asia Trophy

Remarks:
1 Match delayed by 10 minutes due to rain. Game reduced to 80 minutes (40 minute halves).

First Division League

Senior Shield

FA Cup

2014 AFC Champions League

Qualifying play-off

South China failed to qualify for the group stage and automatically qualify for the 2014 AFC Cup group stage.

2014 AFC Cup

Group stage

Notes

References

South China AA seasons
South China